McGuane is an Irish surname. Notable people with the surname include:

Luke McGuane (born 1987), Australian rules footballer
Marcus McGuane (born 1999), English footballer
Mick McGuane (born 1967), Australian rules footballer
Thomas McGuane (born 1939), American writer